Janis Krūmiņš  (born January 9, 1992) is a Latvian professional football player who last played for FC Yerevan in the Armenian First League.

Career
In 2019, Krūmiņš joined FC Yerevan. On 21 February 2020, the Football Federation of Armenia announced that FC Yerevan had withdrawn from the league due to financial and technical problems.

References

1992 births
Living people
Footballers from Riga
Latvian footballers
Association football goalkeepers
JFK Olimps players
FC Jūrmala players
FK Daugava (2003) players
Akritas Chlorakas players
Pafos FC players
FK Jelgava players
Latvian Higher League players
Cypriot First Division players
Cypriot Second Division players
Latvian expatriate footballers
Expatriate footballers in Cyprus
Expatriate footballers in Armenia
Latvian expatriate sportspeople in Cyprus
Latvian expatriate sportspeople in Armenia